Erika Hebron (born August 22, 1986) is an American beauty pageant titleholder who won the title of Miss Missouri 2010 and competed in Miss America 2011 on January 15, 2011, in Las Vegas, Nevada. She competed at Miss Missouri as Miss Gateway St. Louis. She was a Top 10 finalist in the 2009 pageant and had won the Talent and Evening Gown awards in the 2010 pageant. Her talent is Lyrical Dance and her platform is the Children's Miracle Network. She is a  2009 Oklahoma City University alumni having obtained a Bachelor of Performing Arts in Dance. She also held the title of Missouri's Junior Miss 2005 and competed at nationals with future Miss America Katie Stam.

References

External links
 

Miss America 2011 delegates
Oklahoma City University alumni
People from O'Fallon, Missouri
Living people
American beauty pageant winners
1986 births